François Langlois B.A., LL.L., D.D.N., Ph.D.,  (born 6 January 1948 in Sainte-Claire, Quebec) was a member of the House of Commons of Canada from 1993 to 1997. He is a lawyer by career.

He was elected in the Bellechasse electoral district under the Bloc Québécois party in the 1993 federal election, thus serving in the 35th Canadian Parliament.

Due to restructuring of electoral districts, Langlois would be a candidate in the Bellechasse—Etchemins—Montmagny—L'Islet riding in the  1997 federal election but lost to Liberal Gilbert Normand. Langlois also failed to unseat Normand in the 2000 federal elections. Langlois made no further attempts to re-enter Canadian politics since then.

References
 

1948 births
Living people
Bloc Québécois MPs
Members of the House of Commons of Canada from Quebec
People from Chaudière-Appalaches